Gazipur-2 is a constituency represented in the Jatiya Sangsad (National Parliament) of Bangladesh since 2004 by Zahid Ahsan Russell of the Awami League.

Boundaries 
The constituency encompasses Gazipur City Corporation wards 19 through 38 and 43 through 57, and Gazipur Cantonment.

History 
The constituency was created in 1984 from a Dhaka constituency when the former Dhaka District was split into six districts: Manikganj, Munshiganj, Dhaka, Gazipur, Narsingdi, and Narayanganj.

Ahead of the 2008 general election, the Election Commission redrew constituency boundaries to reflect population changes revealed by the 2001 Bangladesh census. The 2008 redistricting added a fifth seat to Gazipur District and altered the boundaries of Gazipur-2.

Members of Parliament

Elections

Elections in the 2010s 
Zahid Ahsan Russell was re-elected unopposed in the 2014 general election after opposition parties withdrew their candidacies in a boycott of the election.

Elections in the 2000s 

Ahsanullah Master was assassinated on 7 May 2004. Zahid Ahsan Russell, his eldest son, was elected in an August by-election.

Elections in the 1990s

References

External links
 

Parliamentary constituencies in Bangladesh
Gazipur District